Patricia Louise Herbold (born 1940) is a chemist, former city mayor, and the former United States Ambassador to the Republic of Singapore.

Early life
Ambassador Herbold was born in and grew up in Cincinnati, Ohio. She received a B.A. in chemistry from Edgecliff College (now part of Xavier University) in Cincinnati in 1962, graduating cum laude. She later received a J.D. law degree from the Northern Kentucky University Salmon P. Chase College of Law in 1977, graduating second in her class.

Career

Chemistry
Ambassador Herbold initially worked for the federal government as an analytical chemist dealing with water pollution. She later served as Chief of the Data Processing Unit of the Federal Water Pollution Control Administration Lake Erie Program Office.

Law
After working in pollution control, Herbold began a career as an attorney. She was a prosecutor from 1978 to 1979.  Later, she was Associate Regional Counsel for Prudential Insurance of America from 1979 to 1988. For two years from 1988 to 1990, she was the General Counsel of Bank One. She was an attorney with the Cincinnati law firm of Taft, Stettinius & Hollister from 1990 to 1994.

Local government
Ambassador Herbold was a member of the City Council of Montgomery, Ohio from 1983 to 1986. She was mayor of the city beginning in 1986.

She moved to Washington state in 1995 when her husband, Robert Herbold became Executive Vice
President and Chief Operating Officer of Microsoft Corporation in 1994, where he worked until 2003.

Ambassador Herbold was appointed to be a Commissioner on the Washington State Gambling Commission from 1997 to 2000.

She was elected Chairman of the King County Republican Party in December 2002 and served one term before being appointed Ambassador.

Ambassador to the Republic of Singapore
In 2005, Ambassador Herbold was appointed Ambassador of the United States of America to the Republic of Singapore. Soon after her appointment, she presented her credentials to President S. R. Nathan in a ceremony at Istana.

During the devastation of New Orleans during and after Hurricane Katrina, Singapore sent the largest military forces and aviation assets to participate in the rescue and rebuilding of the city. Singapore sent more rescue personnel and helicopters to the United States than any other country.

In addition to representing the United States, Ambassador Herbold also participated in local events.

On May 18, 2006, she commemorated the return of the Revere Bell to the National Museum of Singapore.
She regularly did volunteer work with children in Singapore.

In 2009, she vacated the post when there was a new U.S. President. She was succeeded by David I. Adelman.

Charitable efforts
Prior to being accredited to Singapore, Ambassador Herbold was a member of the President's 21st Century Workforce Council, on the Board of St. Joseph Orphanage of Cincinnati, the Seattle Art Museum, and the Performing Arts Center Eastside in Bellevue, Washington.

Ambassador Herbold and her husband have supported cancer research. They gave a US$1.5 million
(Singapore $2.5 million) gift to the Fred Hutchinson Cancer Center to establish the Herbold Computational Biology Program.

Environmental conservation
Ambassador Herbold has worked with Long Live the Kings, a non-profit organization dedicated to the restoration of wild salmon in the Pacific Northwest.

Awards
Ambassador Herbold was the first recipient of the annual Scholar of Life Award of St. Joseph Orphanage and was inducted into the Horatio Alger Association of Distinguished Americans in April, 2014.

Family
Ambassador Herbold and her husband, Robert J. Herbold., have three grown children, Donna, Gregory, and Jim, who has ties to Singapore having previously worked for the Infocomm Development Agency.

References

External links

 U.S. Embassy in Singapore biography

1940 births
Living people
21st-century American diplomats
Ambassadors of the United States to Singapore
Mayors of places in Ohio
Women mayors of places in Ohio
Ohio Republicans
Washington (state) Republicans
Salmon P. Chase College of Law alumni
American women ambassadors
21st-century American women